Miruts Yifter (affectionately known as "Yifter the Shifter", 15 May 1944 – 22 December 2016) was an Ethiopian long-distance runner and winner of two gold medals at the 1980 Summer Olympics. His date of birth is often given as 15 May 1944, though there is some uncertainty about this. His name is also sometimes spelled as Muruse Yefter.

Early life
Born in Adigrat in northern Ethiopia, Miruts spent early parts of his youth working in different factories and as a carriage driver. His talent as a long-distance runner was noticed when he joined the Ethiopian Air Force.

Running career
Miruts was called to the Ethiopian national team for the 1968 Summer Olympics in Mexico City, but he made his Olympic debut four years later in Munich Olympics where he won a bronze medal in 10,000 metres. However, he arrived too late for the 5000 metres final.

In the 1973 All-Africa Games he won one gold medal (10,000 m) and one silver (5000 m). At the 1st African Championships in 1979 he won two gold medals (5000 and 10,000 metres).

Miruts was unable to participate in the 1976 Summer Olympics because his nation boycotted the event. Four years later in Moscow, Miruts made up for his disappointments by winning gold in both the 10,000 and 5000 m. In the final of the 10,000 m he sprinted into the lead 300 m from the finish and won by ten metres. Five days later, in the 5000 m final, Miruts was boxed in during the last lap. But with 300 m to go, his Ethiopian teammate, Mohamed Kedir, stepped aside and Miruts again sprinted to victory. Due to his abrupt change in speed when executing his kick to the finish, Miruts acquired the nickname "Yifter the Shifter."

At Coamo, Puerto Rico on 6 February 1977, Miruts ran a World Best for the half-marathon of 1:02:57.

At the Moscow Olympics, part of the mystery surrounding Miruts was the question of his age, which was reported to be between 33 and 42. Miruts refused to give a definitive answer, telling reporters:

"Men may steal my chickens; men may steal my sheep. But no man can steal my age."

The most common versions of his date of birth are 1 January 1938 or 15 May 1944 (see IAAF Profile).

Miruts continued competing into the early 1980s, running on Ethiopia's gold medal winning team at the 1982 and 1983 IAAF World Cross Country Championships.

Death

Miruts died at age of 72 on 22 December 2016 in Toronto, Ontario, where he had lived since 2000. According to family members, he had been suffering from respiratory problems.

He was buried in Addis Ababa, in the Holy Trinity Cathedral cemetery.

International competitions

References

External links 
 
 
 

1944 births
2016 deaths
Sportspeople from Tigray Region
Ethiopian male long-distance runners
Olympic athletes of Ethiopia
Olympic gold medalists for Ethiopia
Olympic bronze medalists for Ethiopia
Athletes (track and field) at the 1972 Summer Olympics
Athletes (track and field) at the 1980 Summer Olympics
Medalists at the 1972 Summer Olympics
Medalists at the 1980 Summer Olympics
World record setters in athletics (track and field)
Ethiopian Air Force personnel
Olympic gold medalists in athletics (track and field)
Olympic bronze medalists in athletics (track and field)
African Games gold medalists for Ethiopia
African Games medalists in athletics (track and field)
Ethiopian emigrants to Canada
Age controversies in sports
Athletes (track and field) at the 1973 All-Africa Games